A paradummy is a military deception device first used in World War II, intended to imitate a drop of paratroop attackers. This can cause the enemy to shift forces or fires unnecessarily, or lure enemy troops into staged ambushes. 

The dolls used for Operation Titanic were nicknamed Rupert by British troops and Oscar by American. The official name was "Device Camouflage No. 15". They were made of burlap and filled with straw or green waste. Some were found in a warehouse on an old British airfield in the 1980s. Some of the original dolls from this find are now exhibited in war museums. The dolls are immobile and about 85 cm tall, consequently smaller than a person, but on the ground during twilight it is difficult to tell the difference between real parachutists. In addition, real parachutists let themselves be hung motionless on the ropes during the jump, so that the ground troops could not tell them apart from real jumpers or comrades who had already been shot in the air.

See also
Military deception
Military dummy

References

Further reading
 Jon Latimer, Deception in War, London: John Murray, 2001 

Military deception during World War II
Military equipment
Military equipment of World War II
Airborne warfare